Schwarzbach is a river of the Bergisches Land, North Rhine-Westphalia, Germany. It is a right tributary of the Rhine near Düsseldorf-Wittlaer. Its source is north of Mettmann.

See also
List of rivers of North Rhine-Westphalia

References

Rivers of North Rhine-Westphalia
Rivers of Germany